Prumnopitys is a genus of conifers belonging to the family Podocarpaceae. The nine recognized species of Prumnopitys are densely branched, dioecious evergreen trees up to 40 metres in height.

Etymology 

Description 

The leaves are similar to those of the yew, strap-shaped, 1–4 cm long and 2–3 mm broad, with a soft texture; they are green above, and with two blue-green stomatal bands below. The seed cones are highly modified, reduced to a central stem 1–5 cm long bearing several scales; from one to five scales are fertile, each with a single seed surrounded by fleshy scale tissue, resembling a drupe. These berry-like cone scales are eaten by birds which then disperse the seeds in their droppings.

Distribution 
The species are distributed on both sides of the Pacific, in eastern Australia, New Zealand, and New Caledonia, and along the mountain ranges of western South America from Chile to Venezuela and Costa Rica. This distribution indicates the origins of Prumnopitys in the Antarctic flora, which evolved from the humid temperate flora of southern Gondwana, an ancient supercontinent.

Taxonomy 
Although the genus Prumnopitys was first described in 1861, it was only from 1978 that it was widely distinguished as distinct from the allied genus Podocarpus, despite the marked differences in cone development with different parts of the cone structure becoming fleshy and berry-like. Many older texts still have the species listed under Podocarpus.

The Chilean species for which the correct scientific name is Prumnopitys andina (previously Podocarpus andinus), has been treated by some botanists as Prumnopitys spicata (Molloy & Muñoz-Schick 1999); however this name is illegitimate (Mill & Quinn 2001).

Several species of Prumnopitys are used for timber, though as they are slow-growing, supplies are very limited and over-cutting has led to some having an unfavourable conservation status.

References

 Gymnosperm Database: Prumnopitys
 de Laubenfels, D. J. 1978. The genus Prumnopitys (Podocarpaceae). Blumea 24: 189-190.
 de Laubenfels, D. J. 1988. Coniferales. in Flora Malesiana, Series I, 10: 337-453. Dordrecht: Kluwer Academic.
 Molloy, B. P. J. & Muñoz-Schick, M. 1999. The correct name for the Chilean conifer Lleuque (Podocarpaceae). New Zealand J. Bot. 37: 189–193. Available online (pdf file).
 Mill, R. R. & Quinn, C. J. 2001. Prumnopitys andina reinstated as the correct name for 'lleuque', the Chilean conifer recently renamed P. spicata (Podocarpaceae). Taxon 50: 1143 - 1154. Abstract.

 
Podocarpaceae genera
Dioecious plants